This is a list of school divisions in Manitoba, and does not include locally-controlled Manitoba Band Operated Schools, which are funded and regulated by the federal Government of Canada.

The province's school divisions and districts are generally categorized by region: Central, Northern/Remote, Parkland/Westman, Southeast/Interlake, and Winnipeg. The one except is Division Scolaire Franco-Manitobaine, which has French-language schools distributed across the regions.

Overview 
The province's school divisions and districts are generally categorized by region: Central, Northern/Remote, Parkland/Westman, Southeast/Interlake, and Winnipeg.

Education in Manitoba falls under the purview of the Minister of Education and is primarily governed by The Public Schools Act and The Education Administration Act, as well as their respective regulations. Locally-controlled Manitoba Band Operated Schools are funded and regulated by the federal Government of Canada.

In 2019/2020, Manitoba had:

 690 public schools
 613 elementary schools
 301 secondary schools
 625 English-only schools
 114 French immersion schools
 26 French-only (Français) schools
 17 bilingual schools with international languages
 3 bilingual schools with Indigenous languages
 Total of 13,786 teachers
 Total enrolment of 186,372

Central region

Northern/Remote region

Parkland/Westman region

Southeast/Interlake region

Winnipeg region and other

References

External links 

 Schools in Manitoba 2019/2020

 

School districts
Manitoba school districts